Till the End of the Night is a 2023 German thriller film directed and co-written by Christoph Hochhäusler. Starring Timocin Ziegler, Thea Ehre and Michael Sideris, the film is about an undercover agent who is supposed to gain the trust of a criminal through a fictitious relationship with a contact person. It is selected to compete for the Golden Bear at the 73rd Berlin International Film Festival, where it had its world premiere on 24 February 2023. The film is also nominated for Best Feature Film Teddy Award. 

It is scheduled to release in Germany  on 6 July 2023.

Synopsis
Undercover agent Robert is given the task to infiltrate the drug organization as the partner of the trans woman Leni, with the aim of gaining the trust of a big dealer. For Robert, who is gay, the love story becomes an unpleasant task as he is equally attracted to and repelled by Leni. The success of the mission will determine whether she must resume the prison sentence or not. It is, of all people, the dealer they are spying on who makes Robert confront his conflicting feelings.

Cast
  as Robert Demant
 Thea Ehre as Leni Malinowski
  as Victor Arth
 Ioana Teodora Iacob as Nicole
 Daniel Drewes as Mondrogai
 Andreas Grusinski as Ben Metz
 Jonny Hoff as Timo
 Gabriele Giersiepen as landlady
 Martin Horn as Head of Department
 Andreas Grusinski as Ben Metz 
 Johnny Hoff as Timo 
 Pink Enskat as Monika Sterz 
 Sahin Eryilmaz as Armin Strauss 
 Anne Schwarz as Nadja Saric
 Rolf Heutmann as Superior Presidency 
 Noah Forouzan	as passerby

Production

The film was shot from 3 May 2022 to 22 June 2022 in Frankfurt am Main, Cologne. In September 2022, the film was reported to be in the post-production with the autumn of 2023 as targetted date for release. It is the fifth collaboration between the director Christoph Hochhäusler and the producer Bettina Brokemper.

Release

Till the End of the Night had its  premiere on 24 February 2023 as part of the 73rd Berlin International Film Festival, in Competition. It is scheduled to release in cinemas on 6 July 2023.

Reception

On the review aggregator Rotten Tomatoes website, the film has an approval rating of 20% based on 5 reviews, with an average rating of 2/10.

David Rooney for The Hollywood Reporter stating that it is "Not worth investigating", concluded writing, "There’s possibly a good story buried in here, but the filmmakers can’t get out of their own way long enough to tell it." Nicholas Bell in IonCinema.com graded the film 1/5 and wrote, "Somehow, Florian Plumeyer’s tediously inept script sabotages not only these themes but also what could have been a striking quartet of viciously unhappy but needy humans."

Accolades

References

External links

 Till the End of the Night at Berlinale
 Till the End of the Night at Film portal 
 

2023 films
2023 thriller films
German thriller films
2020s German-language films
Films directed by Christoph Hochhäusler
2020s German films
Films shot in Frankfurt
2023 LGBT-related films
German LGBT-related films
Films about trans women
LGBT-related thriller films